Chang Hung-lu (born 10 January 1972) is a Taiwanese politician.

Education
Chang obtained his bachelor's degree in political science from Soochow University and master's degree in education from National Taipei University of Education.

Political career
Chang is a close ally of Su Tseng-chang, having worked for him from 1996 to 2004. From 2002 to 2005, he led the Taipei County Bureau of Civil Affairs. Chang stepped down from the Democratic Progressive Party's Central Standing Committee in 2010. During his stint on the New Taipei City Council, ten members of the council were charged with "divulging secrets" in a council speakership election. All charges were cleared by the Taiwan High Court in January 2015. Chang ran for the Banqiao District seat in the Legislative Yuan in 2016, and succeeded incumbent Lin Hung-chih, who did not run for reelection.

References

1972 births
Living people
Democratic Progressive Party Members of the Legislative Yuan
Members of the 9th Legislative Yuan
New Taipei Members of the Legislative Yuan
New Taipei City Councilors
Mayors of places in Taiwan
Members of the 10th Legislative Yuan